The D.I.C.E. Award for Family Game of the Year is an award presented annually by the Academy of Interactive Arts & Sciences during the academy's annual D.I.C.E. Awards. This awarded recognizes "the best title of any genre towards a shared, family gaming experience. The title's play dynamics must be suitable for a younger audience but can appeal to adults as well. These games often offer a mini-game component and encourage group play." Originally only offered as a computer game category, the first winner was Lego Island was developed and published by Mindscape. The first console winner was Pokémon Snap in 2000. The first winner of the current version was Zoo Tycoon 2 in 2005.

The award's most recent winner is Mario + Rabbids Sparks of Hope developed by Ubisoft and was co-published by Ubisoft and Nintendo.

History 
It was originally restricted to recognizing computer games. The first console award was offered as Console Children's/Family Title of the Year in 2000. In 2003, there was an only an award for Console Family Game of the Year. In 2006 console and computer games where merged into award category. Although the current version was initially offered in 2005.
Computer Family/Kids Title of the Year (1998)
Computer Family Title of the Year (1999—2000)
Console Children's/Family Title of the Year (2000)
Console Family Game of the Year (2001—2005)
Computer Family Game of the Year (2001—2004)
Family Game of the Year (2005—present)

Winners and nominees

1990s

2000s

2010s

2020s

Multiple nominations and wins

Developers and publishers 
Harmonix has developed the most nominees and the most awards for Family Game of the Year. Traveller's Tales has developed the most nominees without having developed a single winner. There have been numerous developers that a received consecutive wins:
 Dynamix won Computer/PC Family Game of the Year in 2000 with 3D Ultra Lionel Traintown and 2001 with Return of the Incredible Machine: Contraptions.
 Hudson Soft won Console Family Game of the Year in 2002 with Mario Party 3 and 2003 with Mario Party 4
 Blue Fang Games won Computer Family Game of the Year in 2004 with Zoo Tycoon: Complete Collection and Family Game of the Year in 2005 with Zoo Tycoon 2.
 Harmonix had two winning streaks for Family Game of the Year
 2006 with Guitar Hero, 2007 with Guitar Hero, and 2008 with Rock Band.
 2010 with The Beatles: Rock Band and 2011 with Dance Central.
 Nintendo EPD won in 2020 with Super Mario Maker 2 and 2021 with Animal Crossing: New Horizons.

Nintendo has published the most nominees and the most winners for Family Game of the Year awards, with Sony Interactive Entertainment in second with most nominees and winners. Ubisoft has published most nominees without having published a single winner. There have been numerous publishers that with consecutive wins:
 Nintendo has two winning streaks for consecutive wins as publisher.
 Nintendo won Console Family Game of the Year four years in row from 2000—2003 with Pokémon Snap (2000), Mario Tennis (2001), Mario Party 3 (2002), and Mario Party 4 (2003).
 Nintendo also won in 2020 with Super Mario Maker 2 and 2021 with Animal Crossing: New Horizons.
 Sierra On-Line won Computer/PC Family Game of the Year in 2000 with 3D Ultra Lionel Traintown and 2001 with Return of the Incredible Machine: Contraptions.
 Microsoft Game Studios won Computer Family Game of the Year in 2004 with Zoo Tycoon: Complete Collection and Family Game of the Year in 2005 with Zoo Tycoon 2.
 RedOctane won in 2006 with Guitar Hero and 2007 with Guitar Hero.
 MTV Games won in 2010 with The Beatles: Rock Band and 2011 with Dance Central.
In 2001, Nintendo published every nominee for Console Family Game of the Year.

Franchises 
Lego video games have received the most nominations, however the Mario franchise has won the most Family Game of the Year awards. Disney has had the most nominations without ever won a single award. There have been numerous franchises that have won consecutive awards:
 Mario won Console Family Game of the Year 3 years in row with Mario Tennis in 2001, Mario Party 3 in 2002, and Mario Party 4 in 2003.
 Zoo Tycoon won Computer Family Game of the Year in 2004 with Zoo Tycoon: Complete Collection and Family Game of the Year in 2005 with Zoo Tycoon 2
 Guitar Hero won in 2006 with Guitar Hero and in 2007 with Guitar Hero II
Harry Potter and the Sorcerer's Stone is the only game to receive multiple nominations in the same year. Super Mario Maker receive multiple nominations across multiple years, winning in 2016 and the Nintendo 3DS version being nominated in 2017.

Notes

References 

D.I.C.E. Awards
Awards established in 1998
Awards for best video game